A list of films produced in Russia in 2012 (see 2012 in film).

Film releases

See also
 2012 in film
 2012 in Russia

References

External links
 Russian films of 2012 at the Internet Movie Database

2012
Fil
Russia